Granulifusus pulchellus is a species of sea snail, a marine gastropod mollusk in the family Fasciolariidae, the spindle snails, the tulip snails and their allies.

Description

Distribution

References

 Hadorn R. & Chino M. 2005. A new Granulifusus (Gastropoda: Fasciolariidae) from Japan. Novapex 6(4): 111-113

Fasciolariidae
Gastropods described in 2005